Plounéventer is a commune in the Finistère department, Brittany, northwestern France.

Population

Places of interest
Château de Mézarnou - a large 16th-century fortified manor-house, currently being restored.

See also
Communes of the Finistère department

References

External links

Official website 

Mayors of Finistère Association 

Communes of Finistère
Osismii